The Battle of Bademunde is a 1931 German comedy film directed by Philipp Lothar Mayring and starring Max Adalbert, Claire Rommer and Paul Wagner.  It was one of a number of military comedies made during the late Weimar era. It was shot at the Babelsberg Studios in Berlin. The film's sets were designed by the art director Artur Günther. It was produced and distributed by UFA, Germanys largest film company of the era.

Cast

References

Bibliography
 
 Jacobsen, Wolfgang. Babelsberg: das Filmstudio. Argon, 1994.

External links

1931 films
1931 comedy films
German comedy films
Films of the Weimar Republic
1930s German-language films
Films directed by Philipp Lothar Mayring
UFA GmbH films
German black-and-white films
1930s German films
Films shot at Babelsberg Studios